KBNJ (91.7 FM, "Life Changing") is a radio station broadcasting a Christian adult contemporary format. Licensed to Corpus Christi, Texas, United States, the station is currently owned by World Radio Network, Inc.

History
The Federal Communications Commission issued a construction permit for the station on June 12, 1979. The station was assigned the call sign KQIV on August 13, 1979. On July 27, 1983, the station changed its call sign to KFLB, and on July 18, 1984, to the current KBNJ. On April 25, 1985, the station received its license to cover.

References

External links

BNJ
Radio stations established in 1985
BNJ
1985 establishments in Texas